"Good Company" is a song by British rock band Queen, which was written by Brian May. May also played a "Genuine Aloha" banjo uke and provided all the vocals on the track.

May's comments on the song

Personnel
 Brian Maylead and backing vocals, electric guitars, ukulele, guitar jazz band
 Roger Taylordrums
 John Deaconbass guitar

References

1975 songs
Queen (band) songs
Songs written by Brian May
EMI Records singles
Parlophone singles
Elektra Records singles
Hollywood Records singles